Yacine Derradj (born December 20, 1980 in khelil, Bordj Bou Arréridj Province) is an Algerian footballer. He currently plays as a forward for CA Bordj Bou Arréridj in the Algerian Championnat National.

Club career
 1997-2001 CA Bordj Bou Arréridj 
 2001-2004 USM Sétif 
 2004-2007 ES Sétif 
 2007-2008 USM Annaba 
 2008-pres. CA Bordj Bou Arréridj

Honours
 Won the Algerian League once with ES Sétif in 2007
 Won the Arab Champions League once with ES Sétif in 2007
 Won the Algerian Second Division Championship twice with CA Bordj Bou Arréridj in 1998 and 2001

References

1980 births
Living people
People from Aïn Taghrout
Algerian footballers
CA Bordj Bou Arréridj players
USM Annaba players
ES Sétif players
USM Sétif players
Association football forwards
21st-century Algerian people